Misr University for Science and Technology (MUST) is a university in 6th of October City, Giza, Egypt.

Overview 
 	
Misr University for Science and Technology was established by presidential decree number 245 for 1996. Degrees awarded are accredited by the Supreme Council of Universities. It comprises 13 faculties that follow the credit hours system.

Faculties 

Faculty of Medicine
Faculty of Dental Surgery	
Faculty of Pharmacy	
Faculty of Applied Medical Sciences
Faculty of Physical Therapy
Faculty of Engineering
Faculty of Biotechnology
Faculty of Information Technology
Faculty of Business and Economics
Faculty of Media and Mass Communication
Faculty of Archaeology and Tourist Guidance
Faculty of Special Education
Faculty of Foreign Languages and Translation

Faculty of Engineering 
The faculty consists of the following :

Architectural Engineering Department.
Construction Engineering Department:
Structural Engineering Concentration.
Transportation Engineering Concentration.
Hydraulics, Environmental, Construction Management, or part of its electives.
Electrical Engineering Department:
Power Systems & Machines Engineering Section.
Electronics & Communications Engineering Section.
Biomedical Engineering Section.
Computer & Software Engineering Section.
Industrial & Systems Engineering Department.
Mechanical Power Engineering Department.
Mechatronics Engineering Department.

References

Education in 6th of October (city)
Educational institutions established in 1996
1996 establishments in Egypt
Universities in Egypt
Education in Cairo